Dalea pulchra, the Santa Catalina prairie clover or indigo bush, is a perennial shrub or subshrub of the subfamily Faboideae in the pea family-(Fabaceae). It is found in the southwestern United States and Northwestern Mexico in the states of Arizona, New Mexico, Sonora, and Chihuahua, in the Madrean sky islands region and associated areas.

Santa Catalina prairie clover can be found in some common resource locations, for example: Ironwood Forest National Monument of southern Arizona. It has deep purple flowers.

The Santa Catalina prairie clover has the same name as the sky island mountain range of southeast Arizona, the Santa Catalinas.

References 
USDA: NRCS: Plants Profile Dalea pulchra

External links
Photo--(High Res of flowers); Article - "Wildflowers of Tucson, Arizona": Violet flowers
Photo--(Field Photo); Article - "Biological Survey of Ironwood Forest National Monument"–Arizona-Sonora Desert Museum
Arizona county distribution; New Mexico counties - Natural Resource Conservation Service

pulchra
Flora of the Chihuahuan Desert
Flora of the Sonoran Deserts
Flora of Arizona
Flora of Chihuahua (state)
Flora of New Mexico
Flora of Sonora
~
~